Tanya Mercado (born February 15, 1974), known professionally as Gina Lynn, is an American former pornographic actress, model, and stripper. She was inducted into the AVN Hall of Fame in 2010 and is the Penthouse magazine Penthouse Pet for April 2012. She is also known for appearing with Eminem in the music video for "Superman".

Early life
Lynn was born in Puerto Rico, and moved to New Jersey at age five. She was raised in Jackson Township, New Jersey.

Career
In June 2000, Lynn signed a one-year exclusive performing contract with Pleasure Productions. In 2002, she made a cameo in Analyze That as a stripper. That same year, she appeared with Eminem in the music video for "Superman". From the fourth season of The Sopranos, Lynn made periodic appearances as a stripper in the "Bada Bing" strip club, scenes for which were filmed in Satin Dolls. As of 2009, she continued to make movies for the company, as well as for her own studio, Gina Lynn Productions. She also directs and has over 20 films to her credit.

In 2003, Lynn appeared as the love interest of American rapper Eminem in the music video for "Superman".

In 2006 Lynn was the subject of an interview by the Detroit newspaper Metro Times. The article compared Lynn to fellow porn actors such as Jewel De'Nyle, Belladonna, Taylor St. Claire and John Stagliano.

In 2009 starred in movie Minghags where she played half sister of main character Lenny (Bam Margera).

In March 2012, Lynn was announced by Penthouse to be their Penthouse Pet for April 2012. In 2012, Lynn announced that she had retired from the porn industry, but continues to appear on webcams.

Awards

References

External links

 
 
 
 AVN: "Gina Lynn Hurt in Motorcycle Stunt", Dan Miller, August 29, 2005

1974 births
American female adult models
American female erotic dancers
American erotic dancers
American pornographic film actresses
American people of Dutch descent
American people of Italian descent
American people of Puerto Rican descent
Living people
Penthouse Pets
People from Jackson Township, New Jersey
People from Mayagüez, Puerto Rico
Pornographic film actors from New Jersey
Pornographic film actors from Puerto Rico
Puerto Rican people of Dutch descent
Puerto Rican people of Italian descent